Henri Aarnio (born 9 July 1993) is a Finnish badminton player. He started playing badminton at 9 years old, then at age 19, he won the Finnish International Junior Championships in boys' singles. In 2015, he was the runner-up at the Slovak Open in the men's singles event and in 2016, he became the runner-up of the Hellas Open in the mixed doubles event with Jenny Nyström. In 2017, he became the runner-up at the Estonian International tournament in the men's doubles event partnered with Iikka Heino.

Achievements

BWF International Challenge/Series (5 runners-up) 
Men's singles

Men's doubles

Mixed doubles

  BWF International Challenge tournament
  BWF International Series tournament
  BWF Future Series tournament

References

External links 
 

1993 births
Living people
Sportspeople from Vantaa
Finnish male badminton players
21st-century Finnish people